Blue Creek is a ghost town in the Blue Creek Valley in northeastern Box Elder County, Utah, United States.

Description
The community was a railroad settlement that started as a Union Pacific camp during the final stages of construction of the First transcontinental railroad.

The settlement was named for the Blue Creek Spring,  to the south. Initially a railroad camp, Blue Creek later became a farming community with a few scattered homes and a post office.

In his autobiography, 19th century pioneer Alexander Toponce wrote, "In April and May of 1869, Corinne and Blue Creek were pretty lively places. At the latter place was a big construction camp generally known as Dead Fall and spoken of by some as Hell’s Half Acre."

See also

 List of ghost towns in Utah

References

External links

 Photo of Blue Creek today on Panoramio

Ghost towns in Box Elder County, Utah
1869 establishments in Utah Territory
Ghost towns in Utah